AdvPL (Advanced Protheus Language) is a proprietary programming language based on xBase. It was released in 1999 and is used for development of applications in the ERP Protheus made by TOTVS.

References 

XBase programming language family